Security Service Division is a Bangladesh government division under the Ministry of Home Affairs of Bangladesh responsible for agencies under the ministry that are not law enforcement. Md. Abdullah Al masud Chowdhury is a government secretary and current in charge of the division.

History
The government of Bangladesh decided to split the Ministry of Home Affairs into two different divisions, the Security Service Division and the Public Security Division, on 1 June 2016. On 20 January 2017, the Government issued the official gazette on the split of the Ministry and the formation of the two divisions.

Agencies
Department of Narcotics Control
Department of Immigration & Passport
Bangladesh Fire Service & Civil Defence
Department of Prison

References

2016 establishments in Bangladesh
Organisations based in Dhaka
Government departments of Bangladesh